Robert Kirk may refer to:

 Robert Kirk (philosopher) (born 1933), professor emeritus at the University of Nottingham
 Robert Kirk (folklorist) (1644–1692), minister, Gaelic scholar and folklorist
 Robert C. Kirk (1821–1898), American politician, Lieutenant Governor of Ohio, 1860–1862
 Bobby Kirk (ice hockey) (1909–1970), Irish ice hockey player
 Bobby Kirk (footballer) (1927–2010), Scottish footballer
 Bob Kirk (1845–1886), Scottish professional golfer
 Robert Kirk (pathologist) (1905–1962), Scottish parasitologist and professor of pathology